The 1966 British Empire and Commonwealth Games were held in Kingston, Jamaica, from 4 to 13 August 1966. This was the first time that the Games had been held outside the so-called White Dominions. They were followed by the 1966 Commonwealth Paraplegic Games for wheelchair athletes. Jamaica remains the only host nation of a Commonwealth Games that did not win at least one gold medal in its own games.

Host selection

Kingston was elected host in Rome, Italy at the 1960 Summer Olympics.

Participating teams

34 teams were represented at the 1966 British Empire and Commonwealth Games.(Teams competing for the first time are shown in bold).

Medals by country

Medals by event

Athletics

Badminton

Boxing

Cycling

Track

Road

Diving

Fencing

Shooting

Pistol

Rifle

Swimming
Men's events

Women's events

Weightlifting

Wrestling

External links
 Commonwealth Games Official Site
 A Brief History – from the Delhi 2010 site (archived 8 August 2006)
 1966 British Empire and Commonwealth Games – Australian Commonwealth Games official website (archived 21 May 2007)

 
International sports competitions hosted by Jamaica
Multi-sport events in Jamaica
British Empire and Commonwealth Games
British Empire and Commonwealth Games
Sport in Kingston, Jamaica
Commonwealth Games by year
20th century in Kingston, Jamaica
August 1966 sports events in North America